The Touloulou is the most famous of the typical characters and the queen of Guianan carnival.

Description 

The Touloulou is the queen of the carnival. It is a lady elegantly dressed from head to toe. They are normally women without an inch of skin showing. She wears a petticoat, a balaclava, a Domino mask and long gloves. In order not to be recognized, women go so far as to put colored lenses, wigs and camouflage their voices. They do not wear their usual perfume, buy pairs of shoes for the occasion that they will not return and do not move with their vehicle to remain anonymous.
They parade in the street and participate in masked balls.

There is also a men's suit called Tololo.

In the nightclubs, renamed occasionally "universities", it is the touloulous who invite men to dance. They cannot refuse.

Origin 
This typical figure of Guianan Creole culture represents the bourgeois women of the 18 and 19th centuries, in their Sunday best, dressed in their heads to the feet.

This costume was initially not only worn by women. It was a disguise like any other and in no way recalled elegance but indeed in a satirical way, the women of that time.  It was not until well after, in the twentieth century, that it began to be intended only for women, therefore feminized and finally lost its caricature to become a distinguished, refined and flirtatious representation of women in general, while keeping a mysterious side.  This earned her the title of "Guiana Carnival Queen".

Gallery

See also 
 Carnival
 Carnival in French Guiana
 French Guiana

References

External links 

 Site de la Fédération des Festivals et Carnavals de Guyane
 Guyane-guide : le site de la Guyane - Photos du carnaval
 un historique du carnaval Guyanais
 site en flash du carnaval en Guyane
 Faire de touloulou l'icône emblématique du carnaval universel
 CARNAVAL DE GUYANE. Le carnaval le plus long du monde. 

Carnivals in French Guiana
Entertainment events in French Guiana
February events
Festivals in French Guiana
French Guianan culture
Religion in French Guiana